is a monorail station on the Chiba Urban Monorail in Wakaba-ku in the city of Chiba, Chiba Prefecture, Japan. It is located 6.2 kilometers from the northern terminus of the line at Chiba Station.

Lines
 Chiba Urban Monorail Line 2

Layout
Mitsuwadai Station is an elevated station with two opposed side platforms serving two tracks.

Platforms

History
Mitsuwadai Station opened on March 28, 1988.

See also
 List of railway stations in Japan

External links

Chiba Urban Monorail home page 

Railway stations in Japan opened in 1988
Railway stations in Chiba Prefecture